Stanisław Zduńczyk (born 26 February 1942) is a Polish volleyball player. He competed in the men's tournament at the 1968 Summer Olympics.

References

External links
 

1942 births
Living people
People from Lubartów County
Polish men's volleyball players
Olympic volleyball players of Poland
Volleyball players at the 1968 Summer Olympics
AZS Olsztyn players